This article provides information on candidates who stood for the 1946 Australian federal election. The election was held on 28 September 1946.

In 1944–1945, the United Australia Party (UAP) had reconstituted itself as the Liberal Party of Australia. Former UAP seats are now designated as Liberal seats.

By-elections, appointments and defections

By-elections and appointments
On 10 October 1944, Ted Mattner (UAP) was appointed a South Australian Senator to replace Oliver Uppill (UAP).
On 18 August 1945, Kim Beazley (Labor) was elected to replace John Curtin (Labor) as the member for Fremantle.
On 9 February 1946, Winton Turnbull (Country) was elected to replace Alexander Wilson (Independent) as the member for Wimmera.
On 30 March 1946, Jo Gullett (Liberal) was elected to replace Arthur Coles (Independent) as the member for Henty.
On 15 May 1946, Alexander Fraser (Country) was appointed a Victorian Senator to replace Richard Keane (Labor).
On 14 August 1946, Jack Beasley (Labor), the member for West Sydney, resigned. The following day, Norman Makin (Labor), the member for Hindmarsh, also resigned. No by-elections were held due to the proximity of the election.

Defections
In 1944, the United Australia Party was reconstituted as the Liberal Party of Australia. All former UAP members joined the new party.

Retiring Members and Senators

Labor
 George Martens MP (Herbert, Qld)

Liberal
 Sir Frederick Stewart MP (Parramatta, NSW)
Senator Thomas Crawford (Qld)
Senator Harry Foll (Qld)
Senator John Hayes (Tas)
Senator James McLachlan (SA)

Country
Senator William Gibson (Vic)

House of Representatives
Sitting members at the time of the election are shown in bold text. Successful candidates are highlighted in the relevant colour. Where there is possible confusion, an asterisk (*) is also used.

New South Wales

Northern Territory

Queensland

South Australia

Tasmania

Victoria

Western Australia

Senate
Sitting Senators are shown in bold text. Tickets that elected at least one Senator are highlighted in the relevant colour. Successful candidates are identified by an asterisk (*).

New South Wales
Three seats were up for election. The Labor Party was defending three seats. Labor Senators Stan Amour, John Armstrong and Donald Grant were not up for re-election.

Queensland
Three seats were up for election. The Liberal-Country Coalition was defending three seats. Labor Senators Gordon Brown, Joe Collings and Ben Courtice were not up for re-election.

South Australia
Three seats were up for election. The Liberal Party was defending three seats. Labor Senators Alex Finlay, Theo Nicholls and Sid O'Flaherty were not up for re-election.

Tasmania
Three seats were up for election. The Liberal Party was defending three seats. Labor Senators Bill Aylett, Charles Lamp and Nick McKenna were not up for re-election.

Victoria
Four seats were up for election. One of these was a short-term vacancy caused by Labor Senator Richard Keane's death; this had been filled in the interim by the Country Party's Alexander Fraser. The Liberal-Country Coalition was defending three seats. The Labor Party was defending one seat. Labor Senators Don Cameron and Jim Sheehan were not up for re-election.

Western Australia
Three seats were up for election. The Liberal Party was defending two seats. The Labor Party was defending one seat. Labor Senators Robert Clothier, James Fraser and Richard Nash were not up for re-election.

Summary by party
Beside each party is the candidates put forward by that party in the House of Representatives for each state, as well as an indication of whether the party contested Senate elections in each state.

See also
 1946 Australian federal election
 Members of the Australian House of Representatives, 1943–1946
 Members of the Australian House of Representatives, 1946–1949
 Members of the Australian Senate, 1944–1947
 Members of the Australian Senate, 1947–1950
 List of political parties in Australia

References
Adam Carr's Election Archive - House of Representatives 1946
Adam Carr's Election Archive - Senate 1946

1946 in Australia
Candidates for Australian federal elections